Calgary Police Service (CPS) is the municipal police service of the City of Calgary, Alberta, Canada. It is the largest municipal police service in Alberta and third largest municipal force in Canada behind the Toronto Police Service and the Montreal Police Service.

History 
The Calgary Police Service was founded on February 7, 1885, and initially consisted of two constables led by Chief Jack Ingram.

On October 8, 1993, Constable Rick Sonnenberg was preparing a spike strip to stop a stolen vehicle when he was struck by the fleeing motorist and killed. In the wake of his death and fundraising from the Sonnenberg family, the force acquired a helicopter and formed the Helicopter Air Watch for Community Safety (HAWCS) unit in 1995. In 2003, a second helicopter was purchased, expanding the unit.

In 1995, the Calgary Police Commission appointed Christine Silverberg as chief of police, making her the first woman to lead a large police force in Canada. Silverberg served as chief until 2000, when she retired from the police service.

Shortly after Christmas in 2013, two Calgary police officers and their supervisor detained Godfred Addai after his car became stuck in a snowbank. The officers then released Addai, who was wearing light clothing, in an under-construction community three kilometres from his home, providing him with no aid or clothing despite freezing temperatures and advising police dispatchers to ignore Addai's 9-1-1 calls as he was "just a drunken fool". After Addai called 9-1-1 twice, Constable Trevor Lindsay attended the scene and tased Addai before being captured by a HAWCS helicopter video camera repeatedly punching a handcuffed Addai in the head and back. Addai was charged with assaulting a peace officer, but was acquitted at trial. Cst. Lindsay was later convicted of aggravated assault for an unrelated 2015 incident when he threw a handcuffed detainee to the ground in a police station parking lot, fracturing his skull. Cst. Lindsay resigned from the Calgary Police Service in 2020.

In the early 2010s, in response to regional applicant shortages, the Calgary Police Service briefly accepted applications from international police officers who were not already landed immigrants, permanent residents, or citizens of Canada. The force had ended the program by 2017.

On New Year's Eve, 2020, Sgt. Andrew Harnett, who had been employed by the Calgary Police Service for 12 years, stopped a car "after noticing the vehicle's licence plate didn't match its registration." As Harnett and two other officers who had responded to the traffic stop prepared to arrest the vehicle's passenger on an outstanding warrant, the driver fled the scene with Harnett holding onto the driver's side door. Harnett was dragged 427 metres before falling off of the vehicle and being struck by oncoming traffic. Despite efforts in saving Harnett, he died of his injuries just more than an hour later. He's survived by his mother, wife who was pregnant at the time of his death and his 2 older brothers.

Divisions 

The CPS is divided into the following sections:

 Administration
 Chief Crowfoot Learning Center
 Community and youth services
 Community liaison
 Criminal operations
 Finance
 Fleet and facilities
 Human resources
 Information communication technology section
 Investigation support
 Major crimes
 Operations audit
 Organized crime control
 Professional standards
 Real time operations center (RTOC)
 Support
 Traffic services

Ranks and insignia

Vehicles

Most vehicles used by the Calgary Police Service are imported from the United States and use the black and white colour scheme common of police vehicles in the United States, due to the increased recognition of this color scheme as used by police.

Vehicles currently in use include:
 Ford Police Interceptor Sedan
 Ford Police Interceptor Utility
 Ford F-150
 Ford Transit
 Chevrolet Express Van (Tactical unit & Marked Transport/Utility van)
 Ford Super Duty (Tactical unit only)
 Chevrolet Tahoe (Tactical unit and K9 unit only)
 Cambli Thunder 2 (Tatical unit only)
 Armet Balkan MK7 (Tactical unit only)
 Freightliner M2 106 Mobile Communications Unit 
 Suzuki V-Strom 1000
 Harley-Davidson FLHTP
 Airbus H125 – HAWCS (Helicopter Air Watch for Community Safety) units HAWC1 and HAWC2

Fatalities in the line of duty 
Since its formation in 1885, twelve Calgary Police officers have been killed in the line of duty.

 1917 – Constable Arthur Duncan (gunfire)
 1933 – Inspector Joe Carruthers (gunfire)
 1941 – Constable Wilf Cox (motorcycle collision)
 1957 – Constable Ken Delmage (motorcycle collision)
 1974 – Detective Boyd Davidson (gunfire)
 1976 – Staff Sgt. Keith Harrison (gunfire)
 1977 – Constable Bill Shelever (gunfire)
 1992 – Constable Rob Vanderwiel (gunfire)
 1993 – Constable Rick Sonnenberg (hit while attempting to stop stolen vehicle)
 2000 – Constable John Petropoulos (injuries sustained in fall)
 2001 – Constable Darren Beatty (injuries sustained during training exercise)
 2020 - Sergeant Andrew Harnett (succumbed to injuries dealt to him while performing traffic stop)

Crime statistics 

The Calgary census metropolitan area (CMA) had a crime severity index of 60.4 in 2013, which is lower than the national average of 68.7. A slight majority of the other CMAs in Canada had crime severity indexes greater than Calgary's 60.4. Calgary had the sixth-highest number of homicides in 2013, with 24 homicides recorded.

See also 
 Alberta Law Enforcement Response Teams
 Integrated Security Unit
 Law enforcement in Canada

References

Notes

Further reading

External links 

 Calgary Police Service
 CPS Annual Report 2007

Law enforcement agencies of Alberta
Politics of Calgary
Government agencies established in 1885
1885 establishments in the Northwest Territories